"Doing It" is a song by English singer Charli XCX from her second studio album, Sucker (2014). An alternative version of the song featuring singer Rita Ora was released on 3 February 2015 as the album's third single. The single peaked at number eight on the UK Singles Chart. "Doing It" was named "Best New Track" the week of its release by Pitchfork.

Charli is seen performing a snippet of the song in a commercial for Pepsi's "Out of the Blue" music campaign, which aired during the 57th Annual Grammy Awards, on 8 February 2015.

Ahead of the release of her 2022 album Crash, Consequence of Sound ranked "Doing It" as Charli's fourth best song.

Release
On 7 January 2015, it was announced the European version of XCX's second studio album would be delayed, to allow for the release of a remix of "Doing It" featuring Rita Ora. A. G. Cook of PC Music contributed an official remix. This was her first collaboration with the English producer, who would later go on to be her creative producer for future projects.

Music video
The music video for "Doing It" was directed by Adam Powell and premiered on 20 January 2015. It was filmed in the Californian desert and takes inspiration from Thelma & Louise (1991), Natural Born Killers (1994), Barbie, Florida strip clubs, 1970s fashion and the work of David LaChapelle.

The video depicts Charli and Ora arriving at a gas station and stealing several items before the gas station cashier could stop them. They then leave the gas station with the stolen items and gets chased by the police. Eventually, they escape and stop at a payphone. Later, they are found at a party where the police find them. These scenes are intercut with Charli and Ora singing into microphones with lights surrounding them.

Live performances
Charli performed "Doing It" for the first time on Jimmy Kimmel Live! on 3 February 2015. On 10 February 2015, she performed the song on BBC Radio 1's Live Lounge, along with a cover of Taylor Swift's "Shake It Off".

Charli performed the song with Ora on The Graham Norton Show on 13 February 2015. The following evening, Charli performed it on The National Lottery. She also performed the track on Sunday Brunch on 15 February 2015. Charli performed the song with Jack Antonoff on Today on 5 June 2015.

Commercial performance
"Doing It" debuted at number eight on the UK Singles Chart with 34,810 copies sold in its first week, becoming Charli's fourth UK top 10 entry and Ora's seventh.

Track listings
Digital download
"Doing It" – 3:48

Digital download
"Doing It" – 3:48
"Doing It" (Manhattan Clique Remix) – 3:38

Digital download – Remixes
"Doing It" (A. G. Cook Remix) – 4:00
"Doing It" (Westfunk Remix) – 3:23

Charts

Certifications

Release history

References

2014 songs
2015 singles
Asylum Records singles
Atlantic Records singles
Charli XCX songs
Rita Ora songs
Music videos directed by Adam Powell
Songs written by Charli XCX
Songs written by Ariel Rechtshaid
Songs written by Jarrad Rogers
Songs written by Noonie Bao
Songs written by Burns (musician)
Song recordings produced by Ariel Rechtshaid
Torch songs